Pia Ingela Cecilia Frode is a Swedish actress born on 14 August 1970 in Linköping.

Career
Frode graduated from the theatre school in Malmö in 1994. She also won a Guldbagge Award for Best Supporting Actress in the Swedish comedy film Klassfesten. On the theater stage, she has gained a reputation for her self-produced play "Ängelen" (The Angel) and is currently working on the new play "En stjärt på himlen" (A butt in the sky) in which she is alone on the stage, but accompanied by a four-man orchestra.

Selected filmography 
2000 - Klassfesten (The Class Reunion)
2000 - Together
2001 - Känd från TV (Known From TV)
2006 - Varannan vecka (Every Other Week)

References

1970 births
Swedish film actresses
Living people
Swedish stage actresses
Best Supporting Actress Guldbagge Award winners